Lingwick is a township of about 400 people in Le Haut-Saint-François Regional County Municipality in the Estrie region of Quebec, Canada.

It incorporates the former villages of Gould and Sainte-Marguerite.

Demographics 

References

External links
 

Township municipalities in Quebec
Incorporated places in Estrie
Le Haut-Saint-François Regional County Municipality